Dendropoma maximum is a species of sea snail, a marine gastropod mollusk in the family Vermetidae, the worm snails or worm shells.

Description
These snails are  sessile, although the larvae are capable of swimming to disperse, and live on coral reefs. They feed with a mucus net. Females are identifiable by a mantle slit.

Distribution
Found throughout the Indo-Pacific.

References

Vermetidae
Gastropods described in 1825